Julia Loktev (born December 12, 1969) is a Russian-American film director and video artist.

Early life

Julia Loktev was born in Leningrad, Soviet Union (now St. Petersburg, Russia). She immigrated to the United States as a child and lived in Colorado until leaving for college. She moved to Montreal to study English and film at McGill University.

Career 
Loktev came across Tom Bishell's book of short stories God Lives in St. Petersburg and read it because she had been born in St. Petersburg. She decided to adapt the short story Expensive Trips Nowhere into the film The Loneliest Planet transporting the setting from Kazakhstan to Georgia.

Loktev was resident at Eyebeam in 2005.

In 2015, Richard Brody called her one of the best woman movie directors.

Personal life 
Loktev is Jewish.

In 1989, when she was 19, her father was severely injured in an automobile accident. The event was the subject of her 1998 documentary Moment of Impact.

Films 

 Moment of Impact (1998)
 Day Night Day Night (2006)
 The Loneliest Planet (2011)

Art installation 

 Rough House, Brooklyn Museum of Art's "Global Feminisms" show.

References

External links
 

1969 births
Living people
Soviet emigrants to the United States
Tisch School of the Arts alumni
American documentary filmmakers
American film directors
American people of Russian descent
American women documentary filmmakers